Diacme elealis, the paler diacme moth, is a moth in the family Crambidae. It was described by Francis Walker in 1859. It is found in North America, where it has been recorded from Virginia to Florida, west to Kentucky and Texas. It is also found on Puerto Rico and Bermuda.

The wingspan is 17–23 mm.

References

Moths described in 1859
Spilomelinae